The arrondissement of Montluçon is an arrondissement of France in the Allier department in the Auvergne-Rhône-Alpes region. It has 89 communes.

Composition

The communes of the arrondissement of Montluçon, and their INSEE codes, are:
 
 Ainay-le-Château (03003)
 Archignat (03005)
 Arpheuilles-Saint-Priest (03007)
 Audes (03010)
 Beaune-d'Allier (03020)
 Bézenet (03027)
 Bizeneuille (03031)
 Blomard (03032)
 Braize (03037)
 Le Brethon (03041)
 La Celle (03047)
 Cérilly (03048)
 Chambérat (03051)
 Chamblet (03052)
 La Chapelaude (03055)
 Chappes (03058)
 Chavenon (03070)
 Chazemais (03072)
 Colombier (03081)
 Commentry (03082)
 Cosne-d'Allier (03084)
 Courçais (03088)
 Deneuille-les-Mines (03097)
 Désertines (03098)
 Domérat (03101)
 Doyet (03104)
 Durdat-Larequille (03106)
 Estivareilles (03111)
 Haut-Bocage (03158)
 Hérisson (03127)
 Huriel (03128)
 Hyds (03129)
 Isle-et-Bardais (03130)
 Lamaids (03136)
 Lavault-Sainte-Anne (03140)
 Lételon (03143)
 Lignerolles (03145)
 Louroux-Bourbonnais (03150)
 Louroux-de-Beaune (03151)
 Malicorne (03159)
 Marcillat-en-Combraille (03161)
 Mazirat (03167)
 Meaulne-Vitray (03168)
 Mesples (03172)
 Montluçon (03185)
 Montmarault (03186)
 Montvicq (03189)
 Murat (03191)
 Nassigny (03193)
 Néris-les-Bains (03195)
 La Petite-Marche (03206)
 Prémilhat (03211)
 Quinssaines (03212)
 Reugny (03213)
 Ronnet (03216)
 Saint-Angel (03217)
 Saint-Bonnet-Tronçais (03221)
 Saint-Bonnet-de-Four (03219)
 Saint-Caprais (03222)
 Saint-Désiré (03225)
 Saint-Éloy-d'Allier (03228)
 Sainte-Thérence (03261)
 Saint-Fargeol (03231)
 Saint-Genest (03233)
 Saint-Marcel-en-Marcillat (03244)
 Saint-Marcel-en-Murat (03243)
 Saint-Martinien (03246)
 Saint-Palais (03249)
 Saint-Priest-en-Murat (03256)
 Saint-Sauvier (03259)
 Saint-Victor (03262)
 Sauvagny (03269)
 Sazeret (03270)
 Teillet-Argenty (03279)
 Terjat (03280)
 Theneuille (03282)
 Tortezais (03285)
 Treignat (03288)
 Urçay (03293)
 Valigny (03296)
 Vallon-en-Sully (03297)
 Vaux (03301)
 Venas (03303)
 Verneix (03305)
 Vernusse (03308)
 Le Vilhain (03313)
 Villebret (03314)
 Villefranche-d'Allier (03315)
 Viplaix (03317)

History

The arrondissement of Montluçon was created in 1800. At the January 2017 reorganization of the arrondissements of Allier, it lost 14 communes to the arrondissement of Vichy.

As a result of the reorganisation of the cantons of France which came into effect in 2015, the borders of the cantons are no longer related to the borders of the arrondissements. The cantons of the arrondissement of Montluçon were, as of January 2015:

 Cérilly
 Commentry
 Domérat-Montluçon-Nord-Ouest
 Ébreuil
 Hérisson
 Huriel
 Marcillat-en-Combraille
 Montluçon-Est
 Montluçon-Nord-Est
 Montluçon-Ouest
 Montluçon-Sud
 Montmarault

References

Montlucon